Uliana and Ulyana are feminine given names. People so named include:

 Uliana of Tver (c. 1325–1391), daughter of Prince Alexander of Tver and second wife of Algirdas, Grand Duke of Lithuania
 Uliana Olshanska, Grand Duchess of Lithuania from 1418 to 1430
 Uliana Paletskaya (died 1569), a princess of Russia by marriage to Yuri of Uglich
 Uliana Donskova (born 1992), Russian group rhythmic gymnast
 Uliana Kaisheva (born 1994), Russian biathlete
 Ulyana Lopatkina (born 1973), Russian retired prima ballerina
 Ulyana Sergeenko (born 1979), Russian fashion designer
 Ulana Suprun (born 1963), Ukrainian-American physician and former Minister of Healthcare of Ukraine
 Ulyana Trofimova (born 1990), Uzbekistani rhythmic gymnast
 Uliana Vasilyeva (born 1995), Russian curler
 Ulyana Voitsik (born 1989), Belarusian ice hockey player

See also
 Uljana Semjonova (born 1952), Soviet-Latvian retired basketball player
 Juliana, a given name
 Yuliana, a given name
 Iuliana, a given name

Feminine given names